Lisa Kline is the owner of a Los Angeles boutique of the same name.

Personal life
Kline grew up in Encino, California. She always knew she wanted to own her own boutique and worked in retail stores from the age of 15. She attended Syracuse University, where she studied fashion design until realizing that she preferred marketing clothes to designing them. After graduation, she returned to Los Angeles to work at a shoe store and prepare to open her own store

She was married to Robert Bryson, with whom she had two children. Her husband died in an accidental fall from the upper level balcony of their Malibu, California home in the early morning of January 22, 2009.

The Lisa Kline brand 
The first Lisa Kline store opened on August 5, 1995. On April 17, 1999, she opened Lisa Kline Men, which provided clothing for men and was decorated with a 1970s TV, a bar, playboys, and many other "masculine" accommodations. Kline has been reported saying that the men's store is her favorite. She began on-line sales in 2002, and launched a children's clothing line, Lisa Kline Kids, in 2003. She also owns Lisa Kline stores in Beverly Hills and Malibu.

Celebrity following 
Liv Tyler
Ashton Kutcher
Jessica Simpson
Eva Longoria
Jessica Biel
Carmen Electra
Halle Berry
Paris Hilton
Jessica Alba
Britney Spears
Jennifer Aniston
LeAnn Rimes
Lindsay Lohan
Reese Witherspoon
Debra Messing
Tori Spelling
Lauren Graham

References

External links
Official site

Living people
People from Los Angeles
Syracuse University alumni
Year of birth missing (living people)